The Red Zone is the area in Islamabad, the capital of Pakistan, where Government, Judiciary and Legislature buildings are located. It is also where the President of Pakistan  and Prime Minister of Pakistan reside. It contains several federal buildings with the highest authority including: 

 Senate of Pakistan
 Parliament of Pakistan
 Pakistan Secretariat
 Aiwan-e-Sadr
 Prime Minister's Secretariat
 Supreme Court of Pakistan
 National Library of Pakistan
 Election Commission of Pakistan
 Federal Ministries and Departments

The Red Zone also covers  Constitution Avenue, Third Avenue, and Fourth Avenue.

See also
 Diplomatic Enclave, Islamabad

References

Islamabad